Countess Louise Sophie of Danneskiold-Samsøe (22 September 1796 – 11 March 1867) was a member of a Danish noble family descended illegitimately from Christian V of Denmark, and the wife of Christian August II, Duke of Schleswig-Holstein-Sonderburg-Augustenburg. She was the grandmother of German Empress Auguste Victoria, wife of the last German Emperor Wilhelm II.

Early life
Countess Louise Sophie of Danneskiold-Samsøe was born on 22 September 1796 in Gisselfeld, Denmark to Christian Conrad, Count af Danneskiold-Samsøe (1774–1823) and his wife Johanne Henriette Valentine Kaas (1776–1843), daughter of the Danish Admiral Frederik Christian Kaas and a descendant of the war hero Jørgen Kaas. The House of Danneskiold-Samsøe is a non-dynastic branch of the House of Oldenburg, descended from Christian Gyldenløve, Count of Samsø, an illegitimate son of Christian V of Denmark by his mistress Sophie Amalie Moth.

Marriage and issue
On 18 September 1820 she married her second cousin Christian August II, Duke of Schleswig-Holstein-Sonderburg-Augustenburg at the Church of Braaby, Gisselfeld. They had seven children:
Prince Alexander Frederick William Christian Charles Augustus (20 July 1821 - 3 May 1823), died young
Princess Louise Auguste (28 August 1823 - 30 May 1872)
Princess Caroline Amelie (15 January 1826 - 3 May 1901)
Princess Wilhelmine (24 March 1828 - 4 July 1829)
Prince Frederick Christian August (6 July 1829 - 14 January 1880), later Duke of Schleswig-Holstein-Sonderburg-Augustenburg. He married Princess Adelheid of Hohenlohe-Langenburg became father of one surviving son and four daughters including Augusta Viktoria, German Empress.
Frederick Christian Charles Augustus (22 January 1831 – 28 October 1917), he married Princess Helena of the United Kingdom, and settled in England. They were the parents of Albert, Duke of Schleswig-Holstein.
Princess Caroline Christiane Auguste Emilie Henriette Elisabeth (2 August 1833 - 18 October 1917), married in 1872 Johann Friedrich von Esmarch (9 January 1823 - 23 February 1908)

Later life and death
Louise Sophie died on 11 March 1867 in Primkenau in the Kingdom of Prussia, aged 70 and was buried in the Lutheran church of Primkenau.

Descendants
Her descendants include: Auguste Viktoria, German Empress, Queen Frederica of the Hellenes, Constantine II of Greece, Queen Sofía of Spain, Felipe VI of Spain and Carl XVI Gustaf of Sweden.

Ancestry

References

Citations

External links 

19th-century Danish nobility
Princesses of Schleswig-Holstein-Sonderburg-Augustenburg
1796 births
1867 deaths
Danneskiold-Samsøe family